Lapeer East High School was a public high school located in Lapeer, Michigan. It was the rival school of Lapeer West High School. In 2010, all portable classrooms were removed and the school was reverted to 9-12 grade students.  It was built in 1975 as a result of overcrowding of the former Lapeer High School, which became Lapeer West High School. In 2014, Lapeer East was renamed to Lapeer High School due to the consolidation of the two high schools, the consolidation owing to declining enrollments at both high schools. Which was due to an increasingly low number of elementary and kindergarten enrollments.

Notable alumni
Jake Long - Former NFL player

References

Educational institutions in the United States with year of establishment missing
Public high schools in Michigan
Schools in Lapeer County, Michigan
1975 establishments in Michigan
2014 disestablishments in Michigan
Defunct schools in Michigan